Lewis Thornton Babcock (born April 4, 1943) is a senior United States district judge of the United States District Court for the District of Colorado and former judge of the Colorado Court of Appeals.

Education and career

Born in Rocky Ford, Colorado, Babcock received a Bachelor of Arts degree from the University of Denver in 1965 and a Juris Doctor from University of Denver Law School in 1968, and was in private practice in Rocky Ford from then until 1976. While in private practice, he was city attorney for Las Animas, Colorado from 1969 to 1974 and Rocky Ford from 1970 to 1976; he was also an assistant district attorney in La Junta, Colorado. In 1976, he became a district judge in Colorado's 16th Judicial District in La Junta, and chief judge of the district in 1978. He became a judge in the Colorado Court of Appeals in 1983. He received a Master of Laws from the University of Virginia School of Law in 1988.

Federal judicial service

Babcock was nominated by President Ronald Reagan on June 23, 1988, to a seat on the United States District Court for the District of Colorado vacated by Judge John L. Kane. He was confirmed by the United States Senate on October 14, 1988, and received his commission on October 17, 1988. He served as Chief Judge from 2000 to 2007. He assumed senior status on his 65th birthday on April 4, 2008.

Notable cases

Among Judge Babcock's notable cases were civil lawsuits over the Columbine High School massacre, and Lane v. Owens, a 2003 decision to enjoin enforcement of a Colorado law requiring students and teachers to recite the Pledge of Allegiance. Judge Babcock also upheld the constitutionality of Colorado's ban on smoking in bars and restaurants.

Other cases include Golan v. Gonzales, in which he held that the copyright provisions of the Uruguay Round Agreements Act did not violate the United States Constitution.

References

Sources 
 
 Hon. Lewis T. Babcock District of Colorado

1943 births
Living people
20th-century American judges
21st-century American judges
American prosecutors
Colorado state court judges
District attorneys in Colorado
Judges of the United States District Court for the District of Colorado
People from Otero County, Colorado
People from Rocky Ford, Colorado
United States district court judges appointed by Ronald Reagan
Sturm College of Law alumni
University of Virginia School of Law alumni